Frýdek-Místek is a city in the Moravian-Silesian Region of the Czech Republic. It has about 54,000 inhabitants. The historic centres of both Frýdek and Místek are well preserved and are protected by law as two urban monument zones.

Administrative parts
The city is made up of seven city parts and villages: Frýdek, Místek, Chlebovice, Lískovec, Lysůvky, Skalice and Zelinkovice. Skalice forms an exclave of the municipal territory.

Geography
Frýdek-Místek is located at the confluence of the rivers Ostravice and Morávka. The city lies in the Podbeskydy Hill, a small part in the north also extends into the Ostrava Basin.

Frýdek-Místek is located on the border of two historical regions. Místek lies in Moravia, while Frýdek lies in Silesia; the Ostravice forms the border between them. The city is situated relatively close the borders of Poland  and Slovakia .

History

The first written mention of Frýdek (as Friedberg) is from 1267, when it appeared in the will of bishop Bruno von Schauenburg. It was later renamed Místek, and a new village called Frýdek was founded nearby, probably between 1327 and 1335. In the 16th century, Frýdek and Místek were parts of the Frýdek-Místek estate. The then owner, bishop Stanislav Pavlovský, decided to split the estate and sell Frýdek in 1584, and merged Místek with the Hukvaldy estate. Místek remained part of it until 1850.

The history of both towns includes devastating fires, plague epidemics and war damage. In the 19th century, several textile factories were established in both Frýdek and Místek, and in 1833 an ironworks was established in Lískovec. Industry caused the economic prosperity of both towns, new houses and public buildings were built.

Místek was one of the few places in former Czechoslovakia where the Czech army offered military resistance to the German invaders. An armed engagement took place here on 14 March 1939.

On 1 January 1943 the Germans joined the previously separate towns of Frýdek and Místek into a single town called Frýdek. In 1945 the town was renamed to its current name. In 2006 Frýdek-Místek became a statutory city.

Demographics

Economy
In Frýdek-Místek several conglomerates have its factories, including Korean Hanwha Group, the Dutch company Huisman - producer of lifting equipment, and the Belgian Vyncke, which designs and builds green and clean energy plants.

The food processing industry has a long tradition in the city, led by brands such as Marlenka (manufacturer of cakes and desserts) or Chodura – Beskydské uzeniny (meat products).

Culture
The city has a tradition of choral singing, represented by several choirs. Ensembles such as the Frýdek-Místek Symphony Orchestra, the Frýdek-Místek Brass Orchestra, the Ostravica Folk Song and Dance Ensemble and the Ostravička Children's Folklore Ensemble perform concert activities.

The annual cultural events organized by the city are the International Folklore Festival and the Festival of Twin Towns.

Sport
The local ice hockey club is HC Frýdek-Místek. The town hosted also the 1988 IIHF European U18 Championship, 1991 IIHF European Women Championships, and the 1994 World Junior Ice Hockey Championships.

The local association football team is FK Frýdek-Místek.

Sights

The historic centre of Frýdek is located around the Zámecké Square with valuable, originally Renaissance houses. By the square is located the Frýdek Castle, originally built in the Gothic style between 1327 and 1339. It was rebuilt in the Renaissance style at the turn of the 16th and 17th centuries. Today the castle houses the Museum of Moravian-Silesian Beskids. Part of the castle is an English-style castle park.

A part of the historic centre of Frýdek is the Church of Saint Judoc. It was built probably in 1612 and at the time of its foundation it was behind the town walls. The Renaissance church is an example of semi-folk architecture.

In Frýdek is located the Basilica of the Visitation of Our Lady. The church was built in 1740–1777 and replaced a wooden chapel, which was a pilgrimage site due to the allegedly miraculous statue of the Virgin Mary. The statue was moved into the new church. In 1999, the church was promoted by Pope John Paul II to a minor basilica.

The historic centre of Místek is formed by Svobody Square, lined with preserved burgher houses with arcades. Near the square is located the Church of Saint James the Great from 1622–1644. It replaced a wooden church consecrated to Saint Nicholas, which was first mentioned in 1582 and was destroyed by fire in 1602. The tower of the church is a landmark of Místek.

Notable people

Viktor Uhlig (1857–1911), Austrian geologist and paleontologist
Petr Bezruč (1867–1958), poet; lived and worked here in 1891–93
Benno Landsberger (1890–1968), German assyriologist
Óndra Łysohorsky (1905–1989), poet
Miloš Macourek (1926–2002), poet and screenwriter
František Valošek (born 1937), footballer
Josef Mikoláš (1938–2015), ice hockey player
Dan Gawrecki (born 1943), historian
Jan Keller (born 1955), politician
Zdeněk Nytra (born 1961), politician
Martin Říman (born 1961), politician
Ivana Chýlková (born 1963), actress
Petr Velička (born 1967), chess player
Tomáš Galásek (born 1973), footballer
David Stypka (1979–2021), singer
Ondřej Palát (born 1991), ice hockey player
Leoš Petrovský (born 1993), handball player

Twin towns – sister cities

Frýdek-Místek is twinned with:
 Bielsko-Biała, Poland
 Harelbeke, Belgium
 Mysłowice, Poland
 Žilina, Slovakia
 Żywiec County, Poland

Gallery

References

External links

 
Populated places in Frýdek-Místek District
Cities and towns in the Czech Republic